College of Letters and Science is an alternate name for College of Arts and Sciences at various universities. 
Institutions known as a College of Letters and Science include the following:

Arizona State University School of Letters and Sciences
University of California, Berkeley College of Letters and Science
University of California, Davis College of Letters and Science
University of California, Los Angeles College of Letters and Science
University of California, Riverside College of Letters and Science
University of California, Santa Barbara College of Letters and Science
University of Wisconsin–Madison College of Letters and Science
University of Wisconsin–Milwaukee College of Letters and Science

See also
College of Arts and Sciences
Liberal arts college